Lewis Anthony Clarkson is an English professional footballer who plays for Tadcaster Albion, as a striker.

Career
Clarkson was one of 12 players to be released by Hull City in the summer of 2013. In August, he signed with Northern Premier League Division One South club Scarborough Athletic. During that season he scored 9 goals in 13 appearances for the club, in all competitions.

On 21 November 2013 he signed an 18-month contract with Bradford City. He made his professional debut in January 2014, playing the last three minutes of a 0–3 away loss against Notts County.

Clarkson scored two goals against Guiseley in a pre-season friendly on 12 July 2014, and a further two goals against UCD in another friendly three days later. Manager Phil Parkinson later played down the hype surrounding Clarkson's form in the pre-season friendlies. After injuring himself in another pre-season friendly, Clarkson was unable to train for two months, with club physio Matt Barrass warning that Clarkson would be subject to a lengthy rehabilitation process.

He moved on loan to Whitby Town in November 2014, and to Ossett Town in January 2015. He was released by Bradford City later that month.

He joined Tadcaster Albion in February 2015.

Career statistics

References

1990s births
Living people
English footballers
Hull City A.F.C. players
Scarborough Athletic F.C. players
Bradford City A.F.C. players
Whitby Town F.C. players
Ossett Town F.C. players
Tadcaster Albion A.F.C. players
English Football League players
Association football forwards